Cops and Robbers is a 1973 crime comedy film directed by Aram Avakian with an original screenplay by Donald E. Westlake which Westlake subsequently expanded into a novel. The film stars Cliff Gorman as Tom and Joseph Bologna as Joe.

Plot
“Cops and Robbers” stars Cliff Gorman and Joseph Bologna as two New York City cops who turn to crime to fund an early retirement for each. They are neighbors and they are living an OK suburban life with homes, a swimming pool and families in a high-density community and they commute to work together. Both are working-class and looking for more money for a better lifestyle.
 
Well, one cop, Joseph Bologna as “Joe,” robs a liquor store while in uniform and literally walks away into the night. After that, he tells his friend and neighbor “Tom,” played by Cliff Gorman, and both ultimately realize that pulling off a big heist would get them out of a dangerous job and, since they are NYPD officers, it gives them a big advantage in whatever crime they choose to accomplish. 
So, what do they do? They go to the mob!

Gorman goes to a mobster’s house and asks what he would pay $2 million for them to steal. The gangster does some verbal jousting and finally tells Gorman about bearer bonds and that he would need to steal $10 million worth of them to earn the $2 million.

It’s how they accomplish the heist and get the payoff that offers the clever details that make the movie. Here are some of “Cops and Robbers’” neat twists:

•	First, after Gorman, who is in disguise, meets with the mobster, some of the gang try to follow him to find out his true identity. As they follow him up an escalator from the subway, a uniformed cop (Bologna) holds up the line after Gorman has passed. Of course, the gangsters don’t realize at that moment that the two are together. By the time they get to the street, Gorman has disappeared, as has Bologna.

•	After deciding to rob a Wall Street brokerage during a tickertape parade for astronauts just back from space (the film is set in the early 1970s), they steal the bearer bonds, but then rip them up and throw them out a window as part of the parade celebration of a cascade of paper coming out of skyscraper windows. This idea is the key component to the whole robbery. They didn’t have to worry about anyone finding the stolen bonds: The bonds no longer exist and the crime is reported by all the media that $12 million was stolen. It’s the irony of the total reported, because the brokerage house executive robbed by the duo snagged $2 million for himself with no one the wiser, but the two crooked cops.

•	For transportation, the duo uses patrol units … “borrowed” and then returned unnoticed from a police garage. Of course, both have uniforms (although Gorman is a plain-clothes detective) and fit both to their advantage, especially at the end when they make the pickup of the $2 million in Central Park in an area where only bicycles were allowed … but so were police cars.

In the end, they survive the mob’s trap in the park and get away with the $2 million, while the mobster is killed because he fouled up and lost the money to the two cops.

Cast
 Cliff Gorman as Tom
 Joseph Bologna as Joe
 Delphi Lawrence as Rich Lady
 Charlene Dallas as Secretary
 John P. Ryan as Pasquale "Patsy" Aniello
 Dolph Sweet as George
 Joe Spinell as Marty
 Shepperd Strudwick as Mr. Eastpoole
 James Ferguson as Liquor Store Clerk
 Frances Foster as Bleeding Lady
 Gayle Gorman as Mary
 Walt Gorney as Wino
 George Harris II as Harry
 Ellen Holly as Ms. Wells
 Randy Jurgensen as Randy
 Albert Henderson as Cop

Additional information
This film was also released under the following titles:
 Entimotatoi kleftes - Greece (transliterated ISO-LATIN-1 title)
 Flics et voyous - France
 Polícias e Ladrões - Portugal
 Rosvot ja jeparit - Finland
 Se ci provi... io ci sto! - Italy
 Snutar som robbar - Sweden
 Treffpunkt Central Park - West Germany
 Unos policías muy ladrones - Spain

Reception
Roger Greenspun wrote a favorable review of the film for the New York Times.

Soundtrack
The score was composed and conducted by Michel Legrand.  The soundtrack was released exclusively on compact disc in August 2009.

Track List:
 Main Title (Cops and Robbers)
 The Sellers
 Uptown
 The Buyer
 Suburbia
 Downtown
 Wall Street
 Papa Joe, The Padrone
 The Caper
 The Lush Life
 The Chase
 The Sleep Song
 The Chase (alternate version)

See also
 List of American films of 1973

References

External links
 
 
 Cops and Robbers (IMCDb)

1973 films
1970s crime comedy films
1970s heist films
American crime comedy films
American heist films
Films set in New York City
Fictional portrayals of the New York City Police Department
Films about the New York City Police Department
Films based on American novels
Films based on works by Donald E. Westlake
Films scored by Michel Legrand
Films directed by Aram Avakian
United Artists films
1973 comedy films
Films produced by Elliott Kastner
1970s English-language films
1970s American films